Eagle News International  (formerly Eagle News Evening Edition) was a Philippine television news broadcasting show broadcast by Net 25. Originally anchored by Alma Angeles and Feamor Tiosen, it premiered on October 24, 2011 replacing I-News on the network's evening line up. The weeknight newscast concluded on April 1, 2022 and it was replaced by Mata ng Agila International in its timeslot. It formerly served as the weekend newscast with Angeles served as the final anchor.

The program is streaming online on YouTube.

Anchors
 Alma Angeles 

Former anchors
 Feamor Tiosen 
 Sam Cepeda 
 CJ Hirro

Filipino edition

Originally anchored by Mariel Soriano and Maricar Velasco the Filipino edition of Eagle News International premiered on October 2, 2018 on the network's Morning line up replacing Chinese News TV. Maricar Velasco served as the final anchor. The show concluded on February 12, 2021. It was replaced by Balitalakayan in its timeslot.

Anchors
 Mariel Soriano 
 Ben Bernaldez 
 Maricar Velasco

See also
List of programs previously broadcast by Net 25

References

External links
 

Philippine television news shows
2011 Philippine television series debuts
2022 Philippine television series endings
2010s Philippine television series
2020s Philippine television series
English-language television shows
Flagship evening news shows
Net 25 original programming